The second Djerad government (Arabic: حكومة جراد الثانية) is the forty-seventh government of the People's Democratic Republic of Algeria. It is the second government formed by Abdelaziz Djerad on 4 May 2020 under President Abdelmadjid Tebboune.

Composition

Ministers

Deputy Ministers

Secretaries of State

References

External links 
Official announcement
Dismissal Minister of Labour, Employment and Social Security of National Solidarity and appointment of Minister of National Solidarity, Family and Women's Issues as Acting Minister of Labour, Employment and Social Security
Appointment Minister of Labour, Employment and Social Security
Dismissal of Minister of Transport and appointment the Minister of Public Works as Acting Minister of Transport

Government of Algeria